Schwarzenhasel is a village approximately 3 km northeast of Rotenburg an der Fulda in the Hersfeld-Rotenburg district of northeastern Hesse, Germany.
 
Henry von Holtzheim built a castle in Schwarzenhasel in 1371, which still stands today.

References

External links
http://www.schwarzenhasel.de

Villages in Hesse
Hersfeld-Rotenburg